Bruce Warwick Smith (born 4 January 1959) is a former New Zealand rugby union player. A wing, Smith represented Waikato and Bay of Plenty at a provincial level, and was a member of the New Zealand national side, the All Blacks, in 1983 and 1984. He played 10 matches for the All Blacks including three internationals.

References

1959 births
Living people
People from Wairoa
New Zealand rugby union players
New Zealand international rugby union players
Waikato rugby union players
Bay of Plenty rugby union players
Rugby union wings
Male rugby sevens players
Rugby union players from the Hawke's Bay Region